Yatiri are medical practitioners and community healers among the Aymara of Bolivia, Chile and Peru, who use in their practice both symbols and materials such as coca leaves.  Yatiri are a special subclass of the more generic category Qulliri, a term used for any traditional healer in Aymara society.

Current status of the Yatiri

Politics
As a result of current events in Bolivia, Yatiris and anything related to their practices have become quite popular, as a reaction against perceived threats from globalization and Western culture, especially anything related to the USA.  El Diario, Bolivian newspaper, mentions offerings made to the Pachamama and other such deities at most contemporary 2007 government events led by the President.

Problems faced by Yatiri

Historical
As a result of Spanish colonization and the influence of Western culture, the Yatiri face pressure from the Western notion of individualism, as opposed to the traditional Aymara concept of community .  The Christian church has also often ostracised the Yatiri, perceiving their role to be superfluous in modern religious practice, and a form of paganism.
This has changed as current government officials openly support Yatiri presence in events that formerly might have had a Catholic chaplain under the terms and practice of the Concordat with the Holy See.

Modern medicine
Whereas the Aymara perceive 'health' to be a relationship with nature, with members of the community, and with ancestors; and the Yatiri play a vital role in strengthening and repairing these relationships.

Terminology
Several Aymara words and phrases are indispensable for an understanding of the role of Yatiri within the Aymara community.  As these concepts are unique to the Aymara setting, there is no adequate English translation.
Qulliri are healers associated with medicinal herbs, and require no special initiation to take up their vocation.
Layqa, traditionally marginalized and shunned, live on the outskirts of Aymara communities and use frogs and snakes in rituals to do harm to others.
Rayu refers to lightning and its physical manifestations. It is these  who have been called to become . ("someone who has or owns the darkness") is an elder  who undertakes the training of an apprentice -to-be.

The Yatiri in the community

Are Yatiri shamans?
Outsiders have often referred to the Yatiri as "shamans"; however, the role of the Yatiri differs markedly from that of the Central Asian shamans.  Shamans typically live and practice in isolation, undergo private and individual initiations to their roles, and practice ecstatic techniques in conjunction with their work.  They also typically learn to heal by learning to heal themselves after a near-death experience.  In contrast, the Yatiri are full members of Aymara communities who participate in the regular lifestyle of the Aymara, and learn their trade from masters.  Like shamans, Yatiri can be both female and male.

Linguistic approach to define the Yatiri
The word  comes from the verb  "to know". The thing that distinguishes  from others in the community is that they have been struck by lightning, and have become . In modern times, because  is a neutral term, not associated by Westerners with sorcery, many  have been called  when outsiders inquire as to their status.

On becoming Yatiri
Who a person will become is affected by the season in which she is born, by her patron saint, and by her  (a specific kind of godparent). The confirmation of this calling, however, is marked by the lightning strike, which typically happens to an unmarried Aymara out herding the flocks. However, occasionally lightning will strike somebody who is not called, making her a  "one who has been struck mistakenly." Once a -to-be has aged a few years, she undertakes a journey to find her , the senior  who will train her. Hilario, the  interviewed by Tomas Huanca in his 1987 thesis traveled three times to his 's homeland, each time as a traveling musician, and once there received tutoring from Hilario, his .

The Yatiri's role in healing
A  is a full participant in the Aymara community; her special role does not relieve her from the social and agricultural duties shared by all community members. She never makes the first move in healing, but always waits for someone who has a complaint or a problem to consult her. She typically exercises her role at home in the presence of either the patient or someone who is acting on the patient's behalf. Occasionally, the 's ritual helpers will indicate that she must treat the patient in person, or travel to a ritual place in order to give an offering. She will also practice outside her home if the patient requests such. The  is placed together with  bullets (small pieces of metal or stone that have been fused together by lightning), as well as with  llama wool, coca, and sculptures of the saints. If the  has been asked to discover a lost object or one taken by thieves, she may use candles in her  ceremony. If she is to heal somebody ill, she may use a piece of cloth-  - that has touched the patient.

Sources

Aymara
Supernatural healing